The 2011–12 season was Anzhi Makhachkala's 2nd successive season in the highest tier of football in Russia, which they finished in 5th place, qualifying for the second qualifying round of the 2012–13 UEFA Europa League. Anzhi also competed in the Russian Cup where they were knocked out by Dynamo Moscow in the Round of 16.

Season events
On 27 December 2011, Yuri Krasnozhan was appointed as Anzhi's new manager, on a five-year contract. However, on 13 February 2012, Krasnozhan resigned as manager of Anzhi, with Andrei Gordeyev and Roberto Carlos being placed in temporary charge again. 

On 17 February, Guus Hiddink was announced as Anzhi's third manager of the season.

Squad

Transfers

In

Loans in

Out

Loans out

Released

Friendlies

2012 Copa del Sol

Competitions

Premier League

First phase

Results summary

Results by round

Results

League table

Championship Group

Results summary

Results by round

Results

League table

Russian Cup

2010-11

2011-12

Squad statistics

Appearances and goals

|-
|colspan="14"|Players away from Anzhi Makhachkala on loan:

|-
|colspan="14"|Players who appeared for Anzhi Makhachkala no longer at the club:

|}

Goal scorers

Clean sheets

Disciplinary record

References

FC Anzhi Makhachkala seasons
Anzhi Makhachkala